Nicola Kathleen Stapleton (born 9 August 1974 in Elephant and Castle, London) is an English actress. She is best known for her roles in EastEnders as Mandy Salter and Emmerdale as Danielle Hutch. A graduate of the Sylvia Young Theatre School, Stapleton began her career at an early age, appearing in films such as Hansel and Gretel and on television in the children's show Simon and the Witch in 1987.

In 1992, she secured a high-profile role on British television as Mandy Salter in the BBC soap opera EastEnders. In 1994, Stapleton quit the role, but in 2011, returned to the role after 17 years. In 2012, she left the role for a second time.

Stapleton's other notable television roles include that of Janine Nebeski in ITV's Bad Girls (2005–06) and Joe Nardone in Channel 4's Young Person's Guide to Becoming a Rock Star (1998).

In 2017, she joined Thomas & Friends as the voice of Rosie, taking over from Teresa Gallagher in the UK and Jules de Jongh in the US. 28 October 2017 marked Nicola's third appearance in Casualty playing her third different character in the show.

Early life
Stapleton was raised near East Street, which runs east to west between the Old Kent Road and Walworth Road in Walworth, south London. She and her younger brother Vince were born to working class parents, Kate, a cleaner from Scotland and Vincent Stapleton, who ran a car hire business.

She attended the Townsend Primary School in South East London, where her parents were advised by a teacher "to channel her energy into something positive." As a result, they sent her to the Corona Theatre School and Sylvia Young Theatre School, where Denise Van Outen and her future EastEnders co-stars, Danniella Westbrook and Samantha Janus, were among her contemporaries.

Career

Early career
Stapleton's career in showbusiness started when she was six, and at the age of eight she had a minor role as an extra in the James Bond film Octopussy (1983). She made her TV debut in the detective series, Dempsey and Makepeace (ITV), in 1985 and she went on to have roles in feature films such as Little Shop of Horrors (Geffen Pictures, 1986); Hansel and Gretel (MGM, 1987); Snow White (MGM, 1987) and Courage Mountain (Paramount, 1990).

At aged 12 she played the part of Sally in the 1987 Children's BBC production, Simon and the Witch. She also had a minor role in the BBC sitcom, Bread.

EastEnders
Stapleton is perhaps best known for her role as the wayward Mandy Salter in the BBC soap opera EastEnders, which she played from 1992 to 1994. During her time in the soap, Stapleton's character was featured in storylines about child and drug abuse, homelessness and prostitution.

Her EastEnders character was also featured in a special episode of the science fiction series, Doctor Who, which was entitled Dimensions in Time (1993). The episode was specially screened as part of BBC's annual fund-raising event, Children in Need. Viewers were asked to phone in and vote which EastEnders character, Mandy or 'Big' Ron, would appear in the show. Two versions were filmed for each voting outcome, but the Mandy version won with 56% of the vote. Stapleton grew tired of all the attention she received from being in such a high-profile show, so she resigned from the role in 1994.

In 2005, in an interview, Stapleton commented: "Working on EastEnders was so high-profile it put me off working on soaps for a while… I've been asked a number of times to go back, but I've done a lot of really credible stuff in theatre, and I thought, 'It took me a long time get here. I'm not ready to go back to Mandy just yet'… The publicity with something regarding EastEnders is huge, and sometimes you end up feeling like a famous person rather than an actress - I wanted my work to be more fulfilling than that."

In June 2011, Stapleton announced that she would be returning to EastEnders after a 17-year hiatus, and she reappeared as Mandy in an episode broadcast in August that year. Stapleton left the role for a second time at the end of her contract, with Mandy departing in May 2012.

Other roles
Stapleton's subsequent TV credits have included; You Bet! (ITV, 1993); The Thin Blue Line (BBC, 1995); The Bill (ITV, 2002); Casualty (BBC, 1999) and Casualty@Holby City (2004); Harry Enfield and Chums (BBC); Audrey and Friends (2000); Brinks Mat: The Greatest Heist (2003) and Jane Hall (ITV, 2006), among others.

She has also appeared in feature films including: Urban Ghost Story (Living Spirit Pictures, 1998); The Killing Zone (1999); It Was an Accident (2000); South West Nine (2001); Goodbye Charlie Bright (2001); Lava (2002) and Chunky Monkey (2001). On stage, she played the role of Peter Pan in a musical version of the J.M. Barrie novel, which she then toured the United Kingdom, alongside actors Terence Donovan and Laurence Mark Wythe, who later become a composer and lyricist in musical theatre.

In 1994, she provided the voice of the popular comic character Minnie the Minx in the second and final Beano Video film Beano Videostars taking over the role of Susan Sheridan (who was the original voice of Minnie in the very first video), although Sheridan voiced a couple of characters in other Beano segments.

In 1998, she was cast in Channel 4's successful Young Person's Guide to Becoming a Rock Star. She played Joe Nardone, a sex-mad guitarist in a Scottish band, which goes from playing pubs to netting a record deal via a string of wild parties. In 2002, Stapleton guest-starred in her first of two roles of ITV1's cop show The Bill, She played tough-talking young mum Tina Pope, who eventually becomes the second victim of the Sun Hill Serial Killer.

Stapleton is more recently known for playing the prisoner Janine Nebeski in the seventh and eighth series of ITV prison drama Bad Girls (2005–06). In the final series, her character embarked on a romance with male prison officer, Donny Kimber who was played by her ex-EastEnders co-star, Sid Owen.

On 4 November 2006, the Stapleton family appeared on Celebrity Family Fortunes, headed by Nicola and that same month, Stapleton guest-starred in the ITV police drama The Bill; her second role in the programme to date. She acted alongside Birds of a Feather star Linda Robson, to form a drug-addicted mother-daughter duo. She played the role of Louise Parker in the 2007 Lynda La Plante televised mini-series, The Commander: The Devil You Know, and appeared in BBC's The Last Enemy in 2008.

On stage, Stapleton has appeared in Cockroach Who at The National Theatre; Of Mice and Men, which toured the United Kingdom; Scissor Happy at the Duchess Theatre (1997); Essex Girls, Corner Boys and Four Star Hotel, which were all shown at the Royal Court Theatre. Nicola also appeared on a television Goodies/Baddies special of Weakest Link. She was the 6th one voted off.

In August 2008, it was announced that she would play the role of Eli Dingle's friend Danielle Hutch on the soap opera Emmerdale; her first scene aired in September 2008. Stapleton said of her role: "Danielle is such an intriguing character because there's more to her than meets the eye. I'm really looking forward to starting filming and I think viewers can expect some interesting encounters as we explore the relationship between Danielle and Eli." Emmerdale series producer Anita Turner added: "I'm so pleased to welcome an actress with Nicola's calibre to the show. Eli likes to manipulate people, but Danielle is a different proposition and she'll definitely get under his skin."

In September 2009, Stapleton appeared in Channel 4's Hollyoaks Later, as the friend of Cindy Cunningham called Savannah. In October 2009, Nicola appeared in the UK Film Council funded short film Hands Solo, a mockumentary about the world's most famous deaf porn star.

Aside from lending her voice to Thomas & Friends, Stapleton has also provided voice talents to the video games Assassin's Creed Syndicate, Assassin's Creed Syndicate: Jack the Ripper and Ni no Kuni II: Revenant Kingdom in which she voiced Ratja in the English version.

Personal life
In October 2001, Stapleton's father was jailed for his part in an £11million VAT computer-chip fraud. Her brother was also fined £10,000, for helping in the fraudulent business, which involved importing VAT-exempt microchips from EU countries and selling them to firms with added VAT, before claiming money back from Customs and Excise. Nicola Stapleton provided the £125,000 bail, for her brother during the trial.

In September 2005, Mr. Stapleton was eventually told by the Court of Appeal, to pay a confiscation order of £1.6 million. In July 2008, Nicola Stapleton battled against the Customs Prosecution Office at the High Court in order to keep her property in South Norwood, which she had purchased from her father for £175,000 before his imprisonment for fraud.

The prosecution claimed that the house had originally been purchased from "ill-gotten gains", and wanted to seize the property as part of the confiscation order. Stapleton maintains that she bought the property out of her earnings as an actress in 2000. The court found in favour of Nicola Stapleton. In January 2014, Nicola gave birth to her first child (with fiancé David Luck), a boy named Ray.

Filmography

Film

Television

Video games

Radio
 Time Hops (BBC, 1994) (5 episodes) [Science Fiction, rerun on BBC Radio 4Extra, 2012]

References

External links
 

1974 births
Living people
English child actresses
People from Elephant and Castle
Actresses from London
English film actresses
English stage actresses
English soap opera actresses
English television actresses
English video game actresses
English voice actresses
Alumni of the Sylvia Young Theatre School